A reach extender (or reacher, grabber arm, helping hand, trash picker, picker-upper, extended gripper, long arm gripper, extended reach grabber, grabber tool, or caliper) is a handheld mechanical tool used to increase the range of a person's reach when grabbing objects. It has applications in waste management, assistive technology, gardening and outdoor work, and in some cases as a children's toy. It is chiefly used to pick items up off the ground, and it is commonly sold in hardware stores.

A reach extender takes the form of a long metal or plastic pole, usually not exceeding  in length, with a handle at one end and a pair of jaws at the other end. The handle is equipped with a trigger that, when pulled, closes the jaws via a lever-and-spring system within the pole. The jaws are open by default and become open when the trigger is released. Some reach extenders may possess a secondary trigger which locks the jaws in position around whatever object they are holding, so the user does not need to maintain a tight grip on the handle. Others have jaws equipped with suction cups for holding round objects more easily, and still others have small magnets for collecting lightweight metallic items. Variations on the basic form of a reach extender depend on what task needs to be accomplished, and significant variation is found in the length of the pole and the maximum weight the reach extender can bear.

Reach extenders are used by litter collection services to aid in picking up litter off the ground without having to bend over. People may construct specially adapted forms for this purpose. Reach extenders are also used to provide accessibility to people with disabilities or who are aging.

A 2009 neuroplasticity study by Cardinali et al. used reach extenders to demonstrate that the human brain maps tools as parts of the body.

References 

Tools